Niels Dekker (born April 22, 1983) is a Dutch born Canadian former soccer player who played in the Canadian Professional Soccer League, Eccellenza, Hoofdklasse, and the USL First Division.

Playing career  
Dekker began playing at the youth level at East Elgin Secondary School, where he was a 3 time MVP. In 1999, he signed with London City in the Canadian Professional Soccer League. He featured in the postseason semi-final match against the Toronto Olympians, where London was defeated 4-1. In 2002, he went abroad to Italy where he played with ASD Massa Lombarda in the Eccellenza. After two seasons in the Eccellenza he returned to the Netherlands to play with BVV Barendrecht in the Hoofdklasse. In 2005, he returned to Canada to sign with the Toronto Lynx of the USL First Division. He made his debut on April 23, 2005 against Portland Timbers. The following season he helped his team to a 10-game undefeated streak at home, and also reached the Open Canada Cup final, but finished runners up to Ottawa St. Anthony Italia.

References 

1983 births
Living people
Canadian soccer players
London City players
BVV Barendrecht players
Toronto Lynx players
Canadian Soccer League (1998–present) players
USL First Division players
Soccer people from Ontario
Association football midfielders